Precious Pupp is an animated television series produced by Hanna-Barbera Productions that aired as a segment on The Atom Ant/Secret Squirrel Show from October 2, 1965 to September 7, 1967.

Plot
The cartoon featured a large mangy dog named Precious Pupp and his owner Granny Sweet. Granny was a kindly woman with a passion for motorcycles, completely oblivious to the fact that her beloved, affectionate pet was something of a neighborhood terror. He had a habit of slipping behind a victim quietly---sometimes in defense of their home, sometimes just for the fun of it---and jolting him with a ferocious series of barks . . . but never where or when Granny could catch him in the act.

Unlike many cartoon animals, Precious did not speak. His usual vocalism was an asthmatic-sounding, "wheezing" laugh used even more famously by Muttley, a Hanna-Barbera character introduced three years later. He usually outsmarted his enemies, most notably Bruiser, the neighborhood bulldog, but he also usually outsmarted his oblivious owner, too.

Twenty-six episodes were produced.

List of episodes

Season 1 (1965)

Season 2 (1966)

Voices
 Don Messick - Precious Pupp, Bowling Champion, Officer Smith
 Janet Waldo - Granny Sweet
 Henry Corden - Burglar

Home video
 Worldvision Home Video released Precious Pupp on VHS tape in the 1980s, which has long since been out of print.
 The episode "Precious Jewels" is available on the DVD Saturday Morning Cartoons 1960's Vol. 1.
 The episode "Bowling Pinned" is available on the DVD Saturday Morning Cartoons 1960's Vol. 2.

Precious Pupp in other languages
 Brazilian Portuguese: O Xodó da Vovó
 Dutch: Precious Pup
 French: Charlemagne
 German: Poldi
 Hungarian: Cukorfalat
 Italian: Precious Pupp
 Japanese: Pappu-chan to Suīto Obasan
 Macedonian: Шеќерко
 Serbian: Kuče Dragoljupče
 Spanish: Lindo Pulgoso
 Turkish: Değerli

Later appearances
 Granny Sweet later made an appearance in the Yo Yogi! episodes "Super Duper Snag" and "Bearly Working", voiced by Kath Soucie.
 Precious Pupp and Granny Sweet appeared in Jellystone! with Granny Sweet voiced by Grace Helbig.

References

External links
 
 Precious Pupp at Don Markstein's Toonopedia. Archived from the original on September 4, 2015.
 Episode index at the Big Cartoon DataBase

1965 American television series debuts
1967 American television series endings
1960s American animated television series
NBC original programming
American children's animated comedy television series
Animated television series about dogs
Hanna-Barbera characters
Television series by Hanna-Barbera
Television series by Screen Gems